Application Development System Online (ADSO) is a tool used to expedite the writing and testing of modular applications using IDMS databases. Activities such as flow-of-control processing, data storage definition, data verification, editing, error handling, terminal input and output, menu creation and menu display are specified by using a series of screens instead of conventional detailed code.

ADSO or ADS/O or just ADS is originally Cullinet product, later company was acquired by Computer Associates.

Components 
ADS/O has three components ADSG, ADSA, ADSR.

 ADSA (ADS Application): Used to develop and compile processes/applications
 ADSG (ADS Map generator): Used to generate the screens/Maps for online application and compile the maps.
 ADSR (ADS Run time): Is used to run the Maps and Application generated by ADSA and ADSG in live ADSR environment.

Tools 
Other tools used along with ADS/O to develop ADS/O application are:

The programs created through IDD are stored in the IDD.
 MAPC (Create Maps) – This utility is used to design user interfaces i.e. screens.
 IDDM (Integrated Data Dictionary) – This is a menu driven utility which facilitates adding, modifying and querying objects in the Integrated Data Dictionary.

ADSO can be used to develop online or batch applications.

Benefits
 Prototype without writing much code
 Review screen displays before coding process logic
 Input records can be automatically edited and verified using the editing and error-handling facilities
 Has a built-in debugging process
 Monitors runtime performance and resource usage
 Process logic can be added at any time
 Testing abilities to view the data and change it if needed
 Allows for step-by-step trace through application

References
Martin and Leben. Fourth-Generation Languages. Prentice Hall. 1986.  Volume 2 (Representative 4GLs). Pages 42, 44, 45 and passim. Google Books.
Fabbri and Schwab. Practical Database Management. Pws-Kent Publishing Company. Boston. 1992. . Pages 146, 182 and 420 to 422. Google Books.

External links
Database Design Tool

Database administration tools